Preveza is a city in the region of Epirus, northwestern Greece, located on the northern peninsula of the mouth of the Ambracian Gulf. It is the capital of the regional unit of Preveza, which is the southern part of the region of Epirus. The Aktio-Preveza Immersed Tunnel –the first and so far only undersea tunnel in Greece– was completed in 2002. The immersed tunnel connects Preveza in the north, to Aktio of western Acarnania to the south.

Origin of the name 

There are three views on the origin of the name "Preveza":

 The first view suggests that the name "Preveza" originates from the Slavic word prěvozъ, meaning passage. This view is adopted mainly by: Max Vasmer, Diogenis Chariton, Fyodor Uspensky, Ioannis Demaratos, Peter Soustal & Johannes Koder, Alexios G. Savvides, Elias Vasilas, Nikos D. Karabelas, Demosthenis A. Donos, and others. Max Vasmer takes the matter a bit further and suggests that the word reached this form (Preveza) from the Slavic through the Albanian language. Karabelas points out that the Slavic word prěvozъ corresponds, almost letter by letter, to the ancient Greek word pereosis (in Greek: περαίωσις), which means passing through.
 The second view suggests that the name originates from the old Albanian word prevëzë -za, which means passage, transition, crossing over. This view is adopted mainly by: Petros Fourikis, Konstantinos Amantos, Max Vasmer, Peter Soustal & Johannes Koder, Alexis G.K. Savvides, Nikos D. Karableas, Demosthenis A. Donos, and others. 
 The third view suggests that the word originates from the Italian word prevesione, which means provision, supply. This view was mainly adopted, in the 1850's, by Panagiotis Aravantinos.

Municipality of Preveza

The present form of the Municipality of Preveza was established in 2011, through the Reform Legislation for Local Government, which merged the following three former municipalities, which in turn became its Municipal Units. (The constituent communities are mentioned in brackets):
Former Municipality of Louros (Ano Rachi, Kotsanopoulo, Louros, Neo Sfinoto, Oropos, Remmatia, Skiadas, Stefani, Trikastro, Vrysoula)
Former Municipality of Preveza (Flamboura, Michalitsi, Mytikas, Nicopolis, Preveza)
Former Municipality of Zalongo (Cheimadio, Eklissies, Kamarina, Kanali, Kryopigi, Myrsini, Nea Sampsounta, Nea Sinopi, Riza, Vrachos)

The municipality has an area of 380.541 km2, the municipal unit 66.835 km2.

History

Antiquity

In antiquity, the south-southwestern part of Epirus was inhabited by the Greek tribe of Cassopeans, part of a larger tribe, the Thesprotians. Their capital city was Cassope (today, near the village of Kamarina). At the southernmost part of Epirus, king Pyrrhus founded, in 290 BC, the town of Berenike or Berenice, named after his mother-in-law Berenice I of Egypt., Today, it is believed that Berenike lies on the hills near the village of Michalitsi, following the excavations by Sotirios Dakaris in 1965. The Ionian Sea, near Berenike, was the site of the naval Battle of Actium, on 2 September 31 BC, in which Octavian's forces defeated those of Mark Antony and queen Cleopatra of Egypt. The ancient city of Nicopolis (Νικόπολις, "Victory City") was built, nearby, by Augustus to commemorate his victory. The city is believed to have, at its peak, a population of 150,000. In AD 90, Epictetus arrived at Nicopolis, after he had been banished by the Roman emperor Domitian, and established a school of philosophy. One of his students, Arrian, became a famous historian and recorded all of his works.

Medieval period

The name Preveza was first attested in the Chronicle of the Morea (1292). However, Hammond places the foundation of Preveza much later, at the end of the 14th century. After 1204, the area was under the Despotate of Epirus.More recent research supports that the city of Preveza was founded only after the first Ottoman conquest of the region in 1463. Therefore, it is most unlikely that Preveza constitutes the continuation of ancient Nicopolis, as earlier scholars have suggested.

First Ottoman period
The Ottomans refounded Preveza probably in 1477, with a subsequent strengthening of the fortifications in 1495. The naval Battle of Preveza was fought off the shores of Preveza on 29 September 1538, where the Ottoman fleet of Hayreddin Barbarossa defeated a united Christian fleet under the Genoese captain Andrea Doria. This day is a Turkish Navy National Holiday, and some of today Turkish submarines called "Preveze".

Venetian intervention

Preveza was hotly contested in several Ottoman-Venetian Wars. In September 1684, at the early part of the Morean War, the Venetians, aided by Greek irregulars, crossed from the island of Lefkada (Santa Maura) and captured Preveza as well as Vonitsa, which gave them control of Acarnania – an important morale booster towards the main campaign in the Morea. However, at the end of the war in 1699 Preveza was handed back to Ottoman rule. Venice captured Preveza again in 1717, during its next war with the Ottomans and was this time able to hold on to the town and fort it – a meager achievement in a war which otherwise went very badly for the Republic. Venetian rule would persist until the very end of the Venetian Republic itself in 1797. During this period, in 1779, the Orthodox missionary Kosmas visited Preveza where it is said he founded a Greek school, which would be the only school of the city during the 18th century. At the end of the 18th century, Preveza became a transit center of trade with western Europe (particularly France), which resulted in the increase of its population to approximately 10,000–12,000.

Year of French rule (1797–1798)

Following the Treaty of Campo Formio, where Napoleon Bonaparte decreed the final dissolution of the Venetian Republic, Preveza – like other Venetian possessions in Greece and Albania – was ceded to Revolutionary France. 280 French grenadiers arrived in Preveza under the commands of General La Salchette. The people of Preveza welcomed the French troops, and formed a pro-French civic militia. Around this same time the poet Rigas Feraios was combining support for the ideas of the French Revolution with calls for a Greek uprising against Ottoman rule. He was intercepted and killed by the Ottoman authorities when en route to meet Napoleon and directly ask for his help for the Greek cause.

Napoleon Bonaparte, however, focused his attention in another direction, launching the French Campaign in Egypt and Syria, placing France at war with the Ottoman Empire and giving little thought to the fate of the small Preveza garrison exposed on the edge of Ottoman territory. In October 1798, the local Ottoman governor Ali Pasha Tepelena – having great ambitions to make himself a semi-independent ruler – attacked Preveza with an overwhelming force. In the Battle of Nicopolis on 12 October 1798 the troops of Ali Pasha and his son Mukhtar completely overwhelmed the French troops and their local allies. Over the next two days, 13–14 October 1798, a major massacre of the French troops and the local Greek population which defended the city took place in Preveza and Port Salaora, on the Ambracian Gulf, starting before Ali Pasha entered Preveza on 13 October but also continuing in his presence. On 14 October, Ali Pasha called on those citizens of Preveza who had escaped to the Acarnanian Mountains to return to the city, and declared that they would be in no danger. However, upon their return, 170 of them were executed by the sword at the Salaora Port Customs. Many prisoners who survived the massacre died from the hardships on the road to Ioannina. In the grand return and reception held for his victorious troops, which Ali Pasha organized at Ioannina, surviving French and rebel prisoners were given the unpleasant role of walking at the head of the procession, holding the cut and salted heads of their companions, under the shouts and jeers of Ioannina's pro-Ottoman residents. From Ioannina, nine captured French grenadiers, and two officers were sent chained to Istanbul for questioning. One of them, Captain Louis-Auguste Camus de Richemont, was later released, possibly mediated by the mother of Napoleon Bonaparte, Maria Letizia Bonaparte, and eventually became a general. Some popularly circulating tales, of doubtful historical authenticity, link this incident with the origins of the Spoonmaker's Diamond, one of the most closely guarded treasures of Istanbul's Topkapı Palace.

Though Preveza would remain under Ottoman rule for more than a century, this event – both the short period of Greek militias active in the city and the shock of the massacre that followed – and the influence of the ideas of the French Revolution had a part in the development of Greek nationalism towards the Greek War of Independence, which broke out three decades later.

Second Ottoman period

From 1798 to 1820, Preveza was under the rule of the semi-independent Ali Pasha Tepelena. Following his death in 1822 at Ioannina, Preveza was more directly controlled from Istanbul. Preveza became the seat of a province (the Sanjak of Preveze) in 1863, until the year 1912 when the city joined Greece. In 1835, educational activity in the city revived with the foundation of a new Greek school, the Theophaneios, named after its sponsor, Anastassios Theophanis. In the following decades, this school became a centre of education in the surrounding area and in 1851 it also hosted a female and a secondary school.

According to the Congress of Berlin in 1878, parts of southern Epirus, including Preveza, were to be ceded by the Ottoman Empire to the Kingdom of Greece. Under this context, five meetings were held in Preveza, between Greek and Ottoman representatives, but all of them failed to reach an agreement. Even before negotiations started, the Ottoman side used a number of Albanian national figures for delaying purposes and appointed Abedin bey Dino, member of the League of Prizren and representative of the Albanian national movement, as Ottoman foreign minister. Moreover, Abedin Dino managed to gather various Albanian personalities in Preveza, from all over Albania and Epirus, who believed that the Ottomans will provide full support to the Albanian movement and were against annexation of Epirus to Greece. They also organized a meeting there in January 1879 and on 28 February 1879, signed a petition with a threat to take arms to prevent an annexation of Preveza to Greece.  As a result of the unrest created, led by Abdyl Frashëri, another Albanian national figure, the local Ottoman governor was recalled. Abedin Dino was also recalled from Preveza, while the recently arrived Albanians left the city and returned to their homelands.

The discussions between the two sides continued later in Constantinople, but the Ottoman side disagreed with the proposed border by using as an excuse the unrest created by Albanian representatives. In March 1881, the Ottoman side proposed the cession of Thessaly and Arta regions, a proposal that ignored the Albanian positions, and was finally accepted by Greece, although most of Epirus was still outside Greece. On the other hand, the Greek organisation, Epirote Society, founded in 1906 by members of the Epirote diaspora, Panagiotis Danglis and Spyros Spyromilios, aimed at the annexation of the region to Greece by supplying local Greeks with firearms.

From 1881 to 1912 the main sectors of the local economy witnessed dramatic decline and the port of the city lost most of its former commercial significance. However, education was still flourishing with two schools operating: one boys' and one girls' school. The school system of the city was primarily financed by Anastasios Theofanis, notable member of the diaspora.

Balkan Wars

The city of Preveza remained under Ottoman control until finally taken by the Greek Army on 21 October 1912, during the First Balkan War. The city was liberated after the Battle of Nicopolis, by the Greek forces under Colonel Panagiotis Spiliadis. A garrison of the 8th Infantry Division was stationed in the city by December. Later on in the same war, on 8 February 1913, the inhabitants of Preveza were involved in the first instance in world history of a pilot being shot down in combat. The Russian pilot N. de Sackoff, flying for the Greeks, had his biplane hit by ground fire following a bomb run on the walls of Fort Bizani near Ioannina. He came down near Preveza, and with the help of local townspeople repaired his plane and resumed his flight back to base. In the following months there arrived in Preveza the famous Swiss photographer Frederic Boissonnas, and a lot of photographs from this period are available today. Preveza along with the rest of southern Epirus formally became part of Greece via the Treaty of London in 1913.

After the Balkan Wars the harbor of Preveza became a significant regional commercial center in western Greece. Moreover, local labor unions were created during the Interwar period.

Second World War
Along with the rest of Greece, Preveza was occupied by Fascist Italy (1941–1943) and Nazi Germany (1943–1944) during World War II. Before the occupation, the Jewish community had 250 members. They were arrested and exterminated in the Nazi death camps, only 15 survived. After the departure of the Wehrmacht from Preveza, in September 1944, an episode of the Greek Civil War known as the Battle of Preveza took place, lasting for 16 days, between armed partisans of the right-wing EDES and the left-wing EAM-ELAS. The fights stopped after the Convention of Cazerta between Great Britain and the two main Greek resistance groups, EDES and ELAS.

Modern period

Today Preveza is a commercial harbor and tourist hub, with a marina, 4 Museums, two cinemas, an open theatre, a music Hall (OASIS), many clubs, taverns, and cafes, benefiting from its proximity to the nearby Aktion National Airport and the nearby island of Lefkada, a major tourist destination. There are in the city the University department of Financial (department of university of Ioannina) and Commercial Navy Academy. The Aktio-Preveza Immersed Tunnel, opened on 2002, is an important work of infrastructure for what has traditionally been a remote and underdeveloped region, and links Preveza to Actium (Aktio) on the southern shore of the Ambracian Gulf, greatly shortening the distance of the trip to Lefkada.

In July 2022, Preveza was affected by the large wildfires.

Notable sights 

 Ancient Nicopolis area (Walls, Basilica of Alkisson, Basilica of Domitius, Roman Odeon, Nympheum, Roman Baths, Cemetery, Theatre, Augustus Monument, Roman Stadium, Roman Villa of Manius Antoninus etc.)
 Ancient Cassope (400 BC),  from Preveza
 Ancient Trikastron citadel (700 – 300BC),  from Preveza
 Ancient Berenikea, Michalitsi village hills (270 BC).
 Archaeological Museum of Nikopolis
 St. Charalampos Church (1715–1793)
 St. Varnavas Church
 St. Abassos Church
 Forest of Lekatsas, in Myrsini village
 Fortress of Laskara, Ali Pasha period (1810)
 Fortress of Pantocrator, Ali Pasha period (1810)
 Fortress of Saint Andrew, Venetian (1701–1717) and Ottoman period (1810)
 St. George's Castle, Preveza (1718)
 Fortress of Reniassa (or Fortress of Despo) in Riza (1280)
 St. Elias Church (1780)
 Aktio-Preveza Undersea Tunnel, 2002
 Kostas Karyotakis' statue and last residence
 Madonna Church of Foreigners (Panagia ton Xenon) (1780)
 Monolithi beach and Monolithi forest
 National Bank of Greece building (1931)
 Odysseus Androutsos' marble statue
 Ottoman baths of Ali Pasha Tepelena
 Seytan Pazar, traditional commercial street
 Venetian clock tower of Preveza

Notable natives and residents 
Odysseas Androutsos, a hero of the Greek War of Independence.
Evaggelos Avdikos, sociologist, professor of University of Thessaly.
Gerasimos Bekas, (*1987) writer and playwright.
Rae Dalven (1904–1992), American scholar and translator of poetry of Constantine P. Cavafy and Joseph Eliya into English.
Ahmed Dino, Albanian rebel leader and politician.
Shahin Dino, Albanian leader in the Greco-Turkish War of 1897.
Abedin Dino, founding member of the League of Prizren and leading figure of the Albanian National Awakening.
Ali Dino (1890–1938), famous Albanian cartoonist and member of the Hellenic Parliament.
Rasih Dino (1865–1928), diplomat and signatory of Albania to the Treaty of London.
Xhemil Dino Albanian Politician.
Theodoros Grivas (1797–1862), hero of the Greek War of Independence.
Jannis Kallinikos, scholar and intellectual.
Ioannis Kefalas (1794–1876), benefactor, member of Filiki Eteria
Nikolaos Konemenos (1837–1906), scholar.
Nikos D. Karabelas, writer and president of the foundation "Actia Nicopolis" in Preveza.
Kleareti Malamou-Dipla (1898–1977), poet and writer.
Despina Papamichail, tennis player
Athina Papayianni, athlete.
Kostas Provatas (1906–2001), popular painter from Nikopolis.
Anastasios Theofanous (d. 1814), merchant and benefactor, founder of Theofanios School of Preveza.
Thrasyvoulos Tsakalotos (1897–1989), Hellenic Army chief and ambassador.
Athanasia Tsoumeleka, athlete and Olympic Games Gold winner, in Fast Running.
Alexios Vlachopoulos, hero of the Greek War of Independence.
Konstantinos Vlachopoulos, hero of the Greek War of Independence.

Transport
Preveza is linked by road to Igoumenitsa and other coastal settlements through the E55 national road, and is also linked with other cities in Epirus such as Ioannina and Arta. The Aktio-Preveza Undersea Tunnel links Preveza by road to Aetolia-Acarnania in Central Greece.  Preveza also has a small commercial and passenger port and is served by the nearby Aktion National Airport, which also serves the island of Lefkada.

Historical population statistics

International relations

Twin towns – sister cities 
Preveza is a founding member of the Douzelage, a unique town twinning association of 24 towns across the European Union. This active town twinning began in 1991 and there are regular events, such as a produce market from each of the other countries and festivals. Discussions regarding membership are also in hand with three further towns (Agros in Cyprus, Škofja Loka in Slovenia and Tryavna in Bulgaria).

Gallery

See also
 Actium
 Battle of Actium (31 BC)
 Ancient Nicopolis (31 BC)
 Battle of Preveza (1538 AC)
 Battle of Nicopolis-Preveza (1798 AC)
 Battle of Preveza, Greek Civil War, 1944
 Aktio-Preveza Undersea Tunnel, 2003
 Assembly of Preveza (1879 AC)
 Archaeological Museum of Nikopolis 
 List of settlements in the Preveza regional unit

References

Sources

External links

 Official website
 TEI of Preveza (Technological University, Department of Finance and Auditing)
 Preveza (municipality) on GTP Travel Pages (in English and Greek)
 Preveza (town) on GTP Travel Pages (in English and Greek)
 Preveza Weather Station SV6GMQ – Live Weather Conditions (in English and Greek)

 
Mediterranean port cities and towns in Greece
Municipalities of Epirus (region)
Populated places in Preveza (regional unit)